"Man You Gotta Get Up" is a 1998 single by The Apples in Stereo. Released as a 7" included with the vinyl edition of the band's 1997 album Tone Soul Evolution, the two sides of the record are labelled "side three" and "side four", suggesting that Tone Soul Evolution contains sides one and two.

Both songs from the single were later released on the 2008 b-sides and rarities compilation Electronic Projects for Musicians.

Track listing
Side Three
"Man You Gotta Get Up" – 2:57
Side Four
"The Golden Flower" – 3:11

External links
Cover art at Optical Atlas

1998 singles
1997 songs
Sire Records singles